Golosov Ravine (Голосов Овраг), also known as Vlasov (Власов) ravine is a deep ravine in Moscow, Russia, between the Kolomenskoe Hill and Dyakovo Hill. The ravine has several springs and a brook streaming at its bottom. Up in the ravine, on the left side of it, there is a Neopagan shrine, organized around two venerated "sacred stones". In years 2006–2007, during the renovation of Kolomenskoe sides of the ravine were reinforced, and pedestrian paths and stairs were created on its sides.

History 
Since ancient times, the ravine has always been shrouded in mystery. There has always been something strange and inexplicable about this place. Moscow historians have found in their metropolitan archives a document dated 1621 that depicts the sudden and unexpected appearance of a small detachment of Tatars on horseback out of a dense greenish fog at the very gates of the royal palace in Kolomna. They were immediately tied up by the soldiers who guarded the entrance to the palace, and interrogated. Being lost and disoriented, the horsemen claimed to be part of the armies of the Crimean khan Devlet I Giray who had attacked Moscow 50 years earlier, in 1571. Sensing defeat and wanting to avoid capture, the horsemen descended into the ravine, where they were quickly enveloped in the dense fog. Riding along the ravine for only a few minutes, they eventually found themselves in the next century! One of the captives, Murza, said that the fog was unusual - of light greenish color, but none of them paid attention to it in fear of the chasing. Tsar Mikhail Fedorovich ordered to hold an inquiry, which revealed that the men 'probably told the truth'. They had outdated weapons - arms and armour - mostly of 1560s or 1570s types and old-fashioned clothes.

This wasn’t the only reported incident that took place in the vicinity of Golosov Ravine. Mysterious disappearances of residents of neighboring the ravine villages repeated time and time again and remain unsolved to this day. Historians argue that the archive of the police department of the Moscow province contains documents that report on the two peasants, Arhip Kuzmin and Ivan Botchkarev, who disappeared in 1810 and unexpectedly appeared 22 years later, in July 1832. They had a big night out at a neighboring village and decided to take a shortcut through the ravine on their way home even though they knew that the ravine was considered to be infamous. A blanket of thick greenish fog settled over the ravine, and all of a sudden, a 'glowing passage' unexpectedly emerged, full of greenish light. The men entered it and met large, hairy, manlike creatures who tried by using hand gestures to explain to them that they had fallen into 'a different world', from which it would not be easy to get out of, but they would help them. The villagers did, after all, get out of the ravine and moved further. When they got back to their village, they were shocked to find that 22 years had passed. Their wives and children aged significantly and hardly recognized them. The incident was reported to the police who conducted an investigation, during which one of the men dissolved into the fog again and never returned. The other man, seeing this, became depressed and later killed himself. This case was described in the newspaper "Moscovkie vedomosti" in July 1832. 

For centuries, both locals and visitors have met some strange hairy manlike creatures in and around Golosov ravine. Such cases were recorded not only in the ancient and medieval chronicles, but also in the Soviet periodical press. These woodland creatures most likely represent the leshy - a sort of bigfoot from Slavic mythology who is more man than ape and more woodland spirit than mortal creature. In 1926, a local police officer stumbled upon a 'hair-covered wild man in a dense fog' who was two and half meters tall (8.2 ft). The cop blurted out everything that was in his gun, but 'the ghost melted away quickly in the fog'. Local schoolchildren were even involved in the search for the unusual guest, but any attempts to locate and catch him were unsuccessful. However, this incident made the front page of one of the metropolitan dailies under the headline "Pioneers are catching a leshy" written by the journalist A.Ryazantsev.

The sacred stones 
The "sacred stones of Kolomenskoe" are a pair of local sandstone rocks of peculiar shape, located high in the ravine. Some sources claim them to be granite boulders of glacial origin, but this seems to be a misconception. Both rocks have traces of manual processing, both old (exaggerating the shape of the stones), and new (as they have been vandalized by modern graffiti). Initially the stones were located further down the ravine, closer to the springs, but during one of the renovations of the park in the Soviet era they were dragged to the place where they reside now.

From the viewpoint of geology, Moscow is located in the central part of the East European Plain that a solid and strong geological structure. However, it has fault lines that are large enough, and one of the largest of them just passes under Golosov Ravine. Powerful jets of radiations are released through the faults, and since the ravine is located strictly from west to east, it seems to dissect the natural Earth's natural magnetic field. 

Back in 1995-1996, scientists from the Prokhorov General Physics Institute of Russian Academy of Sciences carried out measurements of electromagnetic fields near the stones. The results were stunning: it was found that electromagnetic radiation in the ravine exceeds the norm by more than 12 times, and near boulders - 27 times. It has been noticed that sometimes mobile phones suddenly discharge in the ravine, while the arrow on a compass points not to the north, but to the epicenter of the enchanted ravine.

The ancient shrine of Veles 
According to a recently popularized theory, Golosov Ravine might have initially hosted a shrine dedicated to the Slavic deity Veles. The name of Veles is said to be traceable in modern name of the ravine (Golosov or Vlasov, through Volosov, from Velesov). The shrine might have been later Christianized, with the stones re-interpreted by local inhabitants as traces of a famous battle between St. George (the patron saint of Moscow) and the dragon, thus preserving the ancient mythological motif under new names (see "Enemy of Perun and storm myth" section in Veles article).

Modern veneration practices 
The stones have their own names: one is called Deviy (or Devichiy, meaning "Virgin"), and is associated by modern worshipers with giving fertility to women, while the other one is called Gus’ (Гусь, meaning "Goose"). Local lore tells that they help to cure certain diseases, so people come and sit by them, and also tie small pieces of tissue onto nearby trees.

History of the veneration 
According to some sources, the stones were not continuously venerated by locals in the 20th century, which would mean that the tradition is discontinuous, and may not follow the older patterns, whatever they might have been.

Springs 
The nearby springs are also considered sacred (miracle-bearing) in contemporary Eastern Orthodoxy, Neopagan and New-Age traditions. Before the Revolution of 1917 there was a wooden chapel standing on top of (or near?) the springs, which implies that the springs were considered "sacred" or "holy" in the past as well. Several springs have (or had) their own names: Kadochka (literally: "Little Tub"; seemingly the most venerated one, with its sub-springs associated with St. George and Our Lady of Kazan); Peter and Paul's spring; the spring of the 12 apostles; St. Nicholas spring. Some of these springs were destroyed during the recent renovation works in the ravine.

References

Sacred rocks
Slavic mythology
Religious buildings and structures in Moscow
Modern paganism in Russia